The Heart of the Matter is the seventeenth studio album by Kenny Rogers, released by RCA Nashville.  It was Rogers' eleventh album to reach #1 on Billboard's Country albums chart and certified Gold by the RIAA.

Overview
This was Rogers' final album to reach #1 on the country charts until after his death. It peaked at #51 on the main Billboard album chart and was produced by George Martin.

Singles
Two singles came from this album. "Morning Desire" reached the top of the country charts, as well as #8 on the adult contemporary chart and #72 on the pop charts. His next single, "Goodbye Marie", came from the Short Stories album (also released after Rogers signed to RCA) and charted. The final single from this album followed, "Tomb of the Unknown Love", was a #1 hit in the country charts.

Track listing

Personnel 

 Kenny Rogers – lead vocals
 Anne Dudley – keyboards (1, 2, 4, 7)
 John Hobbs – keyboards (1, 3, 5, 8, 9, 10)
 Randy Waldman – keyboards (5, 8, 10)
 David Foster – acoustic piano (6), synthesizers (6), Moog bass (6), LinnDrum (6)
 Jimmy Cox – keyboards (9)
 Ian Bairnson – guitar (1, 2, 4, 7)
 Billy Joe Walker Jr. – guitar (1, 2, 4, 7)
 Michael Landau – guitar (3, 9)
 Steve Lukather – guitar (3)
 Stanley Jordan – guitar solo (4)
 Paul Jackson Jr. – guitar (5, 8, 10)
 Fred Tackett – guitar (5, 8, 10)
 Mo Foster – bass (1, 2, 4, 7)
 Joe Chemay – bass (3), backing vocals (3, 8)
 Neil Stubenhaus – bass (5, 8, 10)
 Nathan East – bass (9), backing vocals (9)
 Stuart Elliott – drums (1, 2, 4, 7)
 Leon "Ndugu" Chancler – drums (9), percussion (9)
 Steve Leach – percussion (1)
 Richard Marx – percussion (1), backing vocals (1)
 Kin Vassy – percussion (1), backing vocals (3, 4, 7-10)
 Terry Williams – percussion (1), backing vocals (1, 3, 4, 7, 8, 10)
 John Robinson – percussion (2), drums (3, 5, 8, 10)
 Gary Herbig – saxophone (1, 3)
 Larry Williams – saxophone (1)
 Bill Reichenbach Jr. – trombone (1)
 Gary Grant – trumpet (1, 9)
 Jerry Hey – trumpet (1, 9), horn arrangements (9)
 Donnie Sanders – saxello (2)
 James Galway – flute (6)
 James Thatcher – French horn (6)
 Richard Todd – French horn (6)
 Gayle Levant – harp (4)
 George Martin – arrangements (1, 3, 8), string arrangements (2, 4)
 Jeremy Lubbock – string arrangements and conductor (5, 6, 8, 10), additional keyboards (6)
 Jules Chakin – string contractor (2, 4, 5, 6, 8, 10)
 Israel Baker – strings (2, 4, 5, 6, 8, 10)
 Arnold Belnick – strings (2, 4, 5, 6, 8, 10)
 Denyse Buffum – strings (2, 4, 5, 6, 8, 10)
 Stuart Canin – strings (2, 4, 5, 6, 8, 10)
 Isabelle Daskoff – strings (2, 4, 5, 6, 8, 10)
 Assa Drori – strings (2, 4, 5, 6, 8, 10)
 Bruce Dukov – strings (2, 4, 5, 6, 8, 10)
 Ronald Folsom – strings (2, 4, 5, 6, 8, 10)
 Reginald Hill – strings (2, 4, 5, 6, 8, 10)
 Bill Hybel – strings (2, 4, 5, 6, 8, 10)
 William Hymanson – strings (2, 4, 5, 6, 8, 10)
 Dennis Karmazyn – strings (2, 4, 5, 6, 8, 10)
 Ray Kelley – strings (2, 4, 5, 6, 8, 10)
 Kathleen Lenski – strings (2, 4, 5, 6, 8, 10)
 Gordan Marron – strings (2, 4, 5, 6, 8, 10)
 Buell Neidlinger – strings (2, 4, 5, 6, 8, 10)
 Bill Nuttycombe – strings (2, 4, 5, 6, 8, 10)
 Garry Nuttycombe – strings (2, 4, 5, 6, 8, 10)
 Don Palmer – strings (2, 4, 5, 6, 8, 10)
 Jay Rosen – strings (2, 4, 5, 6, 8, 10)
 Sheldon Sanov – strings (2, 4, 5, 6, 8, 10)
 David Schwartz – strings (2, 4, 5, 6, 8, 10)
 Fred Seykoura – strings (2, 4, 5, 6, 8, 10)
 Marshall Sosson – strings (2, 4, 5, 6, 8, 10)
 Robert Sushel – strings (2, 4, 5, 6, 8, 10)
 Mari Tsumari-Botnick – strings (2, 4, 5, 6, 8, 10)
 Shari Zippert – strings (2, 4, 5, 6, 8, 10)
 Kenny Rogers II – backing vocals (3, 9)
 Herb Pedersen – backing vocals (7, 9, 10)
 David Morgan – backing vocals (9)

Production 
 Producer – George Martin
 Engineers – Terry Christian and Jon Kelley
 Second engineers – Bino Espinoza, Laura Livingston and Stephen Shelton
 Strings recorded by John Richards
 Second Engineer (strings) – Olivier de Bosson
 Recorded at Sunset Sound (Hollywood), Lion Share Recording (Los Angeles), Soundcastle (Santa Monica), Evergreen Studios (Burbank) and Studio Marcadet (Paris, France)
 Mixed by Jon Kelley at Soundcastle and Hollywood Sound Recorders (Hollywood)
 Mix assistants – Bino Espinoza and Mike Wuellner
 Mastered by Wally Traugott at Capitol Mastering (Hollywood)
 Product manager – Antony Amos
 Art direction – Becky Stewart
 Design – John Coulter Design
 Photography – Matthew Rolston
 Liner notes – Peter Doggett
 Management – Dreamcatcher Artist Management

Charts

In popular culture
"Don't Look In My Eyes" was used by NBC Sports for a music video of the 1986 Boston Red Sox during the postgame show of the 1986 World Series, after the New York Mets defeated the Red Sox in Game 7 to win the World Championship.

References

External links
[ The Heart of the Matter album page at Allmusic]

Kenny Rogers albums
1985 albums
Albums produced by George Martin
Liberty Records albums